Karabad (also Romanized as Karābād and Karrābād; also known as Garābād and Karrāwa) is a village in Razab Rural District, in the Central District of Sarvabad County, Kurdistan Province, Iran. At the 2006 census, its population was 665, in 164 families.

The village is populated by Kurds.

References

External links

Karabad at the GeoNet Names Server
Karabad at MapLandia.com
Karabad Map at FallingRain.com
Geography population map at Tageo.com, retrieved September 5, 2007.

Towns and villages in Sarvabad County
Kurdish settlements in Kurdistan Province